Oukaïmeden (Berber language: Ukayemdan) is a ski resort in the Atlas mountains near the Toubkal mountain, about  from Marrakesh, Morocco.

There are some hotels and ski rental facilities nearby.

Oukaimeden has a warm-summer Mediterranean climate (Csb) with short but warm summers and long, chilly winters with a great amount of snowfall.

See also 
 Oukaïmeden Observatory

References

External links
Overview of Oukaïmeden at PlentyofSnow.com
Official Website

Tourist attractions in Morocco
Ski areas and resorts in Morocco
Atlas Mountains
Geography of Marrakesh-Safi
Buildings and structures in Marrakesh-Safi